The Nostradamus World Tour was a concert tour by English heavy metal band, Judas Priest, in support of the group's 16th studio album, Nostradamus, which was released in June 2008.

The tour began in June 2008 with a European leg starting in Helsinki, and wrapping up mid-July in Istanbul, Turkey. The jaunt included appearances at festivals such as Download, Graspop Metal Meeting, and Roskilde.

The group kicked off a North American leg in July beginning in Seattle. In early August, the band commenced the Metal Masters Tour portion of the itinerary in Camden, New Jersey, which featured fellow heavy metal stalwarts Heaven and Hell, Motörhead, and Testament.

In September, the act visited Australia, South Korea, and Japan. The following month, the band toured Mexico and South America through mid-November.

In February 2009, the act kicked off a second leg of European shows as part of a touring package dubbed the "Priest Feast", which also featured Megadeth and Testament. The tour started in Dublin and culminated in Amsterdam in late March.

In late June, the band commenced a jaunt of special shows in North America to commemorate the 30th anniversary of the group's renowned album, British Steel. The record was performed in its entirety for the first time, alongside a selection of "other Priest classics". The tour, which featured Whitesnake as the support act, began in Indianapolis and wrapped up late August in Gilford, New Hampshire.

In mid-October, the group returned to Japan to perform three dates. The jaunt included a headline slot at the Loud Park Festival in Chiba City, the final date of the entire tour.

A live album entitled, A Touch of Evil: Live, which features songs recorded on the band's 2008 dates, was released in July 2009. The group were subsequently awarded a 2010 Grammy Award for Best Metal Performance for their live rendition of "Dissident Aggressor", which originally appeared on Sin After Sin.

The group's performance at the Hard Rock Arena in Hollywood, Florida, U.S. was recorded and issued on DVD as part of the 30th anniversary reissue of British Steel, released in May 2010. A limited edition was also available which included a CD of the performance, as well as a DVD.

Tour dates

 1^ Date part of the "Metal Masters Tour" featuring acts Heaven and Hell, Motörhead and Testament.

Cancelled dates

Support acts

 Airbourne (Zwolle and Huttwil)
 Black Steel (Perth)
 Cavalera Conspiracy (Zwolle, Zagreb and Liberec)
 Electric Mary (10–14 September 2008)
 Heaven and Hell (6–10, 13–19, 22–24 and 27–31 August 2008)
 Iced Earth (Zwolle, Düsseldorf, Munich and Huttwil)
 Kiuas (Helsinki)
 Kix (Columbia)
 Megadeth (11 February – 23 March 2009)
 Metal Church (Saint Paul)
 Mortal Sin (Sydney)
 Motörhead (6–10, 13, 16–24 and 27–31 August 2008)
 Pop Evil (5–12, 15, 19–22, 25, 26 and 31 July; 8, 11–16, 20–23 August 2009)
 Testament (22–30 July 2008; 6–10 and 13–31 August 2008; 27–31 October 2008; 11 February – 23 March 2009)
 Voivod (Montreal)
 Whitesnake (1–17, 19, 21 and 31 July; 8 and 11 August 2009)

References

External links
 Official website 

2008 concert tours
2009 concert tours
Judas Priest concert tours
Concerts at Malmö Arena